The Senetea is a small river in the Harghita Mountains, Harghita County, central Romania. It is a left tributary of the river Mureș. It flows through the municipality Suseni, and joins the Mureș in the village Senetea. It is fed by several smaller streams, including Fagu Roșu.

References

Rivers of Romania
Rivers of Harghita County